When the Day Had No Name or Koga denot nemaše ime (Кога денот немаше име) is a 2017 Macedonian drama film directed by Teona Strugar Mitevska. It was screened in the Panorama section at the 67th Berlin International Film Festival. 

The film is a fiction work that covers the pre-incident investigation of a murder mystery which occurred in Skopje in 2012.

Cast
 Leon Ristov as Milan
 Hanis Bagašov as Petar
 Dragan Miševski as Vladan
 Stefan Kitanovic as Ace
 Labina Mitevska as Milan's stepmother

References

External links

 

2017 films
2017 drama films
Macedonian drama films
Macedonian-language films